Detective Hieronymus "Harry" Bosch is a fictional character created by American author Michael Connelly. Bosch debuted as the lead character in the 1992 novel The Black Echo, the first in a best-selling police procedural series now numbering 24 novels.

The novels are more or less coincident in timeframe with the year in which they were published. Harry, as he is commonly known by his associates, is a veteran police homicide detective with the Los Angeles Police Department. He was named after the 15th-century Dutch artist Hieronymus Bosch.

Titus Welliver portrayed the title character from 2015 to 2021 in Bosch, a television series adapted from the novels, and from 2022 in its spin-off series Bosch: Legacy.

Biography of the character

Background
Bosch's mother was a prostitute in Hollywood who was murdered on October 28, 1961, when Bosch was 11 years old. His father, who he met later in life, was Mickey Haller Sr., a prominent defense attorney known for representing mobster Mickey Cohen, among other clients.

Bosch spent his youth in various orphanages and youth halls, and with the occasional foster family. When he learned of his mother's murder, Bosch, then living at a youth hall, dived to the bottom of the pool, screamed until he ran out of air, and then swam back to the surface. This event is referred to in several Bosch novels.

He joined the United States Army at age 17, after getting his foster father to sign the enlistment papers. In Vietnam, Bosch was a "tunnel rat" (nicknamed "Hari Kari Bosch"), with the 1st Infantry Division—a specialized soldier whose job it was to go into the maze of tunnels used as barracks, hospitals, and on some occasions, morgues, by the Vietcong and North Vietnamese Army. While in the enemy tunnels, the Tunnel Rats would kill enemy soldiers they encountered, gather documents for analysis by military intelligence, and then plant C-4 high explosive charges that they would set to detonate after they exited the tunnels. Once, while on R&R leave in Hawaii, Bosch went AWOL, but returned to his unit and served two tours of duty in Vietnam. He was awarded the Distinguished Service Medal (U.S. Army) which can briefly be seen in Bosch (TV series) season four episode 10, kept in a small wooden box alongside his passport and a LAPD Marksmanship Badge.

Bosch has a daughter named Madeline "Maddie" Bosch with his ex-wife Eleanor Wish. Maddie spent most of her time with her mother in Hong Kong, where Eleanor was a professional gambler and star attraction at a Macau casino. Bosch saw his daughter in person only twice a year.

Eleanor had a personal security guard, Sun Yee, who was also her boyfriend. Eleanor was later killed during an attempt to rescue Maddie from Chinese thugs, detailed in 9 Dragons. Subsequently, Maddie lived with her father in Los Angeles.

LAPD career
After his return from Vietnam and an honorable discharge from the Army, Bosch joined the LAPD and rose to the rank of Detective III, a position which entails both investigative and supervisory duties, and is the LAPD equivalent of Detective Sergeant.

While in the LAPD, Bosch worked in the prestigious Robbery Homicide Division (RHD) for five years but was drummed out by an Internal Affairs Division (IAD) investigation involving Bosch's shooting of a suspect (The Dollmaker) who was later linked to nine murders. Following the IAD investigation, which was conducted by Detectives Pierce Lewis and Don Clarke, Bosch was sent to Hollywood Division and assigned to the Homicide desk. (Lewis and Clarke also investigated Bosch in The Black Echo).

At one point, Bosch left the LAPD and worked as a private investigator for three years. He left retirement and returned to the LAPD at the conclusion of The Narrows. After his return, Bosch was assigned to RHD's Open-Unsolved Unit, a cold case squad. Bosch transferred out of Open-Unsolved and into Homicide Special during the time between Echo Park and The Overlook.

During his time in the LAPD as covered in the novels, Bosch was in Hollywood Homicide and worked with Frankie Sheehan (Bosch's partner in RHD, who was later murdered in Angels Flight), Jerry Edgar (his longest-serving partner), and Kizmin "Kiz" Rider, the other members of Bosch's team in Hollywood Homicide. The 2004 Limited Edition DVD that was available with The Narrows included an excerpt of a speech real-life LAPD Chief William Bratton made at the Police Academy, in which he publicly asked Harry Bosch to return from retirement (Connelly was on the stand behind him listening to the speech; see Blue Neon Night: Michael Connelly's Los Angeles). In The Overlook, Connelly gave Bratton an approving endorsement (albeit without using his name) for "raising the morale of the rank and file"  and for giving "Bosch his job back" (pp. 145–146 of the Vision paperback edition).

In The Closers, Bosch was once again partnered with Rider, while Edgar remained in Hollywood Homicide. Bosch remained partnered with Rider until her transfer to the Chief's office after being shot during Echo Park.

During The Overlook, Bosch partnered with Detective Ignacio "Iggy" Ferras, a younger detective with whom Bosch had not yet developed a solid rapport.  In The Drop and The Black Box he is partnered with Detective David Chu.

Not a stranger to being second-guessed, Bosch was investigated by the LAPD's IAD multiple times and was always cleared.  In The Burning Room he is partnered with a young detective named Lucia Soto.  Bosch is suspended by their unit's commander for a minor violation of departmental procedure after Soto and he cleared a tough homicide case.  Bosch is forced to take retirement even though the disciplinary case against him is eventually dropped.

Post LAPD career
In The Crossing Bosch works as a criminal defense investigator for his half-brother Mickey Haller. Bosch's work helps Haller clear an innocent man who was wrongfully prosecuted for a crime that he did not commit. Although glad to help clear the man's name, Bosch did not enjoy working for the defense during the trial and decides to try something else.

He continues to work as a private investigator in The Wrong Side of Goodbye. He investigates the matter of locating the heir to the estate of a dying billionaire. He also accepts a position as a reserve officer working for the city of San Fernando, California Police Department. The chief of the San Fernando P.D. hires Bosch to work as a detective to benefit from Bosch's years of experience with the LAPD.

Bosch is partnered with Detective Bella Lourdes, and the pair solves a case involving a series of violent rapes. In Two Kinds of Truth, Bosch continues to work as a Detective for the SFPD. He helps clear a double homicide case involving the trafficking of illegal prescription painkilling pharmaceuticals. He also clears his name of wrongdoing in an old LAPD homicide case of his.

Dark Sacred Night sees Bosch pushed to his personal and professional limits. During the events of Two Kinds of Truth, he meets an oxycodone addict named Elizabeth Clayton. He takes her into his home to help rehabilitate her, promising to investigate the unsolved murder of her daughter Daisy. He fulfills this promise in Dark Sacred Night with the help of LAPD detective Renée Ballard (first introduced in Connelly's 2017 novel The Late Show), but Elizabeth relapses and ultimately overdoses—which is implied to be suicide—and Bosch struggles with the knowledge that Elizabeth's sobriety meant that she was constantly reminded of her daughter's death.

Meanwhile, Bosch investigates the cold case murder of a gangster in San Fernando which spirals out of control when a confidential informant is murdered. When the informant's killer is identified, Bosch realises the SFPD detective Oscar Luzon has undisclosed connections to the killer. Bosch engineers an interrogation, but Luzon attempts suicide and winds up comatose. Bosch accepts responsibility to protect Bella Lourdes, knowing that it will cost him a job.

These pressures come to a head when Bosch and Ballard confront Daisy Clayton's killer and coerce a confession out of him.  Bosch then tips off the grieving, Mafia-connected father of another victim about the killer's location. He ultimately relents and alerts the LAPD, but once again faces an uncertain future.

In The Night Fire, Bosch is once again pushed to his limits. He is informed that he has contracted chronic myeloid leukemia from his exposure to radiation in The Overlook, and has also been working as the investigator for his half brother once again (due to Cisco having to undergo an appendectomy). After Haller gets his client off for murdering a judge, the LAPD detective assigned to the case tells Bosch he has "undone everything he did with the badge". This causes Bosch to investigate other leads in the case to find the true killer, which leads him to a law firm also tied to a case Ballard is currently investigating. Bosch ultimately lets the killer go to save Ballard, but manages to find the killer's exit strategy (though is not present for the arrest).

Meanwhile, after the death of his former partner, who was his mentor when he first became a detective, Bosch is given a murder book by his partner's widow, which he took home after retirement. The murder book details the murder of a drug addicted ex-convict. Upon the widow's request, Bosch investigates the murder with Ballard's help, despite quickly realizing his former partner may not have investigated the case at all. In the end, they solve the case and arrest the killer, but Bosch becomes disillusioned after discovering that his partner took the case not to solve it, but to prevent anyone else from doing so, as he was the father of the victim. In the end, Bosch decides to investigate another murder which his partner had taken records on, and Ballard agrees to help him.

Personal characteristics
Bosch lived in a house on stilts at 7203 Woodrow Wilson Drive in the Hollywood Hills.  The money that financed Bosch's upscale home came from his work as a technical advisor for a TV mini-series, in which actor Dan Lacey portrays Bosch in a serial killer case the detective had worked. Bosch's house was later damaged during the Northridge earthquake, shortly before the book The Last Coyote.  After his house was condemned and demolished, Bosch had a new one built on the same road, still facing out over the valley.

Bosch has an active love life, with usually one love interest per book. He has a daughter, Madeline ("Maddie"), who, as of 9 Dragons, is living with him. She had formerly lived with her mother, Harry's ex-wife Eleanor Wish (a former FBI agent, ex-convict, and professional poker player, who Bosch met in The Black Echo and married while on a case in Las Vegas). Wish left Bosch in  Angels Flight and was killed in Hong Kong in 9 Dragons. Recent stories find Bosch linked in a close relationship with FBI agent Rachel Walling.  The liaison formulated in The Narrows and heightened romantically during Echo Park, but Walling broke off the relationship at its conclusion. Walling returned in The Overlook on a strictly professional basis, and she has since resumed a relationship with reporter Jack McEvoy.  Walling notes in The Scarecrow that her relationship with Bosch broke up in part because Bosch was still in love with Eleanor Wish.

Bosch is left handed. His muscles are like nylon cords, strength concealed by economy of scale. He has a moustache and brown hair that is graying.

Bosch's eyes are a key aspect of his appearance; they are brown and nearly black, and were mentioned often for this reason in A Darkness More Than Night.  Connelly gives a good clue as to how he visualizes Bosch when, in The Overlook, Rachel Walling tells Bosch: "You look like House" (actor Hugh Laurie).

Bosch is always finding himself in conflict with authority, whether with his lieutenant, or a deputy chief of police (specifically Irvin Irving, Bosch's recurring nemesis until Irving was forced to retire at the end of The Closers and is now a city councilman), or the FBI. His confrontational side is usually attributed to his strong sense of right and wrong, coupled with little regard for his career.  At the end of The Overlook, Connelly states this trait can be described in a single word: "relentless".  He also uses this word in Lost Light, describing jazz, and implying a self-reference to his own work and personality.

Bosch has a half-brother, Mickey Haller, a Los Angeles attorney who makes his first appearance in the novel The Lincoln Lawyer, although he briefly appears in a flashback in The Black Ice as a boy. Haller is the legitimate son of the attorney who fathered Bosch. In the second Mickey Haller novel, The Brass Verdict, it is revealed that Harry Bosch has known for years of the relationship, but Haller was unaware of it until the end of the book.

Bosch's namesake, the Dutch painter Hieronymus Bosch, was famous for his religious portrayal of earthly sins (mostly debauchery) and their violent consequences. In several of the books there are parallels suggested between the Hell in the paintings and the events of the fictional Bosch's life. "Hieronymus" is the Latin form of the male name Jerome, but Connelly has written he used the nickname "Harry" for the character rather than "Jerry" as a tribute to "Dirty" Harry Callahan, the police officer played in a series of films by Clint Eastwood.

Besides the Connelly series, Harry Bosch has made cameo appearances in books by Paula Woods, Joe Gores, and Robert Crais.  Likewise, during an October 16, 2008 book-signing in San Mateo, California, to promote The Brass Verdict, Michael Connelly informed the audience that Bosch also appeared in a cameo, without identification, in Connelly's novel Chasing the Dime.

With two exceptions the Bosch novels are narrated in the third-person, initially focused entirely on Bosch's point of view. Later novels include occasional scenes from the perspective of other characters, but the overall emphasis is on Bosch. Lost Light (2003), the first novel in the series in which Bosch works as a private investigator, is narrated in the first-person by Bosch, a nod to private detective novels which are traditionally narrated by the investigator. The Narrows (2004), set during Bosch's temporary LAPD retirement, is also narrated by Bosch, but The Closers (2005) returns to third-person narration.

Bosch is a jazz enthusiast and frequently plays vinyl records through vintage audio equipment. In several episodes in the series, a McIntosh MX110 tuner/pre-amplifier, McIntosh MC240 power amplifier, Marantz 6300 turntable, and Ohm Walsh 4 speakers can be seen.

Personal firearms
Bosch carries a revolver in The Black Echo (he has to remove spent cartridges to reload during the S&L shootout). In later books, Bosch uses a "Smith & Wesson" or an "auto pistol", probably a Smith & Wesson Model 5906 9mm which was a popular approved-carry weapon in the LAPD at the time; the weapon was approved for carry as an alternative to the standard-issue Beretta 92FS around 1992–93. In The Black Ice he uses a Smith and Wesson .44 as a decoy gun when entering Mexico so that border guards would seize that and not his service weapon, hidden in his tire well. The gun had been a gift from the father of a victim in a previous case, and Bosch never used it because its grips were for right-handed use, while he is left-handed. In Lost Light, after Bosch retired from Homicide and got his PI license, he kept a Glock 27 .40SW caliber, semi-automatic, subcompact pistol in his closet for personal protection (mistakenly described in the book as a "Glock P7"). After the North Hollywood shootout, the LAPD authorized officers to carry .45 ACP pistols in lieu of the 9mm. In The Overlook Bosch has transferred to the RHD Special Section and carries a Kimber Ultra Carry II .45 ACP caliber semiautomatic pistol. In The Burning Room, Bosch is carrying a Glock 30, .45 ACP caliber, semi-automatic pistol and using the Kimber as his backup gun. In Dark Sacred Night, Bosch carries a Smith & Wesson Model 15 Combat Masterpiece .38 Special. It is referred to as the revolver he carried as a patrol officer in the past.  The S&W Combat Masterpiece was standard issue to LAPD officers from the mid-1970s to 1986, when the Beretta was adopted.

Novel series

Additional appearances
 Cons, Scams & Grifts, by Joe Gores (2001)
 Chasing the Dime (2002), unnamed cameo
 The Last Detective, by Robert Crais (2003), unnamed cameo
 Strange Bedfellows, by Paula Woods (2006)

The Mickey Haller series
 The Lincoln Lawyer (2005)
 The Brass Verdict (2008)
 The Reversal (2010)
 The Fifth Witness (2011)
 The Gods of Guilt (2013)
 The Law of Innocence (2020)

Short stories
 "Christmas Even" (in Murder...And All That Jazz, 2004)
 "Cielo Azul" (in Dangerous Women, 2005)
 "Angle of Investigation" (in Plots with Guns, 2005)
 "Suicide Run" (in Hollywood and Crime, 2007)
 "One Dollar Jackpot" (in Dead Man's Hand, 2007)
 "Father's Day" (in the Blue Religion, 2008)
 "Blue on Black" (in Hook, Line & Sinister, 2010)
 "Blood Washes Off" (in the Rich and the Dead, 2011)
 "Switchblade" (e-published in January 2014)
 "Red Eye" (in FaceOff, 2014)
 "The Crooked Man" (in In the Company of Sherlock Holmes, 2015)

Collections
 Angle of Investigation (2011), includes "Christmas Even", "Father's Day", and the eponymous "Angle of Investigation"
 Suicide Run (2011), includes "Suicide Run", "Cielo Azul", and "One Dollar Jackpot"

Television series

In February 2015, Amazon Prime premiered the series Bosch, based on the novels. The seven season (68 episodes) series stars Titus Welliver as Harry Bosch, and co-stars Amy Aquino as Bosch's superior officer Lieutenant II Grace Billets and Jamie Hector as his partner Det. Jerry Edgar. Henrik Bastin of Fabrik Entertainment produced, and Jim McKay directed. The series follows Bosch "as he pursues the killer of a 12-year-old boy while standing trial in federal court on accusations that he murdered a suspected serial killer in cold blood."  The series was renewed for six additional seasons.

According to Connelly, a number of changes were made "to the world of Harry Bosch ... in making the shift from page to screen". For example, in the television series, Bosch is born nearly 20 years later than in the novels, so that events can happen in the present day time, as they once did in the books. Also in the television series, Harry "is 47 years old and a veteran of the first Gulf War in 1991, where he was part of a Special Forces team that cleared tunnels. He has now been a police officer for twenty years with a one-year exception when he re-upped with the Army after 9/11, as many LAPD officers did. He came back to the force after serving in Afghanistan and again encountering tunnel warfare."

In the TV series, Bosch carries Kimber Custom TLE II .45 ACP caliber semi-automatic pistol as his duty weapon.

A sequel series/revival, Bosch: Legacy, premiered in May 2022.

In the first season of the Netflix television series The Lincoln Lawyer, released May 2022, and adapting The Brass Verdict, Bosch's role from the novel is adapted to the characters of Cisco (portrayed by Angus Sampson) and Raymond Griggs (portrayed by Ntare Guma Mbaho Mwine), the latter a original character considered a direct adaptation of Bosch, who does not appear in the series by name due to rights issues with Amazon Studios.

References

External links
 Michael Connelly's Official Web Site

 
Characters in American novels of the 20th century
Characters in American novels of the 21st century
Fictional Los Angeles Police Department detectives
Fictional Los Angeles Police Department officers
Fictional characters from California
Fictional characters from Los Angeles
Fictional private investigators
Fictional American police detectives
Fictional Vietnam War veterans
Literary characters introduced in 1992
Male characters in literature
Michael Connelly characters
Orphan characters in literature